Rashtrawadi Shiv Sena ('Nationalist Shiva Army') is an  Indian political pro-Hindu organization.

References 

Political parties in India